Medlar (Mespilus germanica) is a large shrub or small tree cultivated for its edible fruits.

Medlar or medlars may also refer to:

Plants 
 Mespilus or medlars, a genus of plants
 Mespilus canescens, Stern's medlar, a close relative of the cultivated medlar, in family Rosaceae
 Crataegus azarolus, azarole or Mediterranean medlar, in family Rosaceae
 Eriobotrya, a genus formerly included in Mespilus
 Eriobotrya japonica, the Japanese medlar or loquat, formerly called Mespilus japonica
 Mimusops elengi, medlar or bullet wood, a tree native to Asia and Australia, in family Sapotaceae
 Vangueria infausta, the African medlar, in family Rubiaceae
 Wolfberry (Lycium species), also called red medlar, in family Solanaceae

Places 
 Medlar Field at Lubrano Park, a baseball stadium in University Park, Pennsylvania
 Medlar-with-Wesham, a civil parish on the Fylde in Lancashire, England

People 
 Medlar (musician) (born 1986), British Deep house producer and DJ
 Bessica Medlar Raiche (1875–1932), American physician and aviator
 Linda Medlar (born 1949), subject of an Independent Counsel investigation during the first term of U.S. President Bill Clinton
 Martin Medlar (1899–1965), Irish Fianna Fáil politician

Other uses 
 MEDLARS, a computerized biomedical bibliographic retrieval system
 I Malavoglia or The House by the Medlar Tree, 1881 novel by Giovanni Verga

See also 
 False medlar (Sorbus chamaemespilus), a deciduous shrub
 Medlar bodies, a skin condition
 Medlar Conservation Area, an area in Five Rivers MetroParks in Montgomery County, Ohio